The Decorator is a 1920 American silent short comedy film directed by Jess Robbins and featuring Oliver Hardy.

Cast
 Jimmy Aubrey as Jimmy
 Oliver Hardy as Babe, a millionaire (credited as Babe Hardy)
 Kathleen Myers as The girl (credited as Catherine Myers)
 Jack Lloyd as Her sweetheart
 Evelyn Nelson

See also
 List of American films of 1920
 Oliver Hardy filmography

External links

1920 films
1920 comedy films
1920 short films
American silent short films
American black-and-white films
Films directed by Jess Robbins
Silent American comedy films
American comedy short films
1920s American films